Olorieni is village and an administrative ward in the Arusha District Council located in the Arusha Region of Tanzania.

In 1978 the population was 2,480 and according to the 2012 census, the population had increased to 22,434.

References

Wards of Arusha District
Wards of Arusha Region